In the Presence of Mine Enemies: 1965–1973 – A Prisoner of War is a memoir by American pilot Howard E. Rutledge, co-written with his wife and Mel and Lyla White, of his time in a Vietnamese POW camp during the Vietnam War. When it was published it was the first book-length firsthand treatment of the experiences of American prisoners of war in Vietnam. It was made into a documentary in the same year.

After the war, Rutledge was head of the University of Oklahoma's department of naval science and twice ran unsuccessfully for a seat in the U.S. House of Representatives from Oklahoma's 4th congressional district. He died of cancer in Norman, Oklahoma in 1984.

References

1973 non-fiction books
Vietnam War memoirs
Memoirs of imprisonment